Azygophleps inclusa is a moth in the family Cossidae. It is found in Kenya, Tanzania, Zambia, Angola, Malawi, Mozambique, Botswana, South Africa, Lesotho, Uganda, the Democratic Republic of the Congo, Ghana, Sierra Leone, Guinea and Côte d’Ivoire.

References

Moths described in 1856
Azygophleps
Moths of Africa